Olga Katherine Torkelsen Hurley (March 30, 1921 – February 21, 2021) was the Secretary to Alaska Territorial Governor Ernest Gruening from 1944 until his departure from office in 1953. She was Chief Clerk to the Alaska Constitutional Convention in 1955–56 and the secretary to the State Senate for five terms. In 1984, she was elected to seat 16-A in the Alaska house, serving until January 1987.

Early life
Hurley was born in Juneau, the daughter of Norwegian immigrants, her father a fisherman and a carpenter. She attended Juneau High School where she was class salutatorian. She went on to attend Behnke-Walker Business College in Portland, Oregon. She joined the staff of Territorial Governor Ernest Gruening as a stenographer/clerk in 1940, when she was 19. She became a governor's assistant in 1941. She was married in 1944 and then became the Executive Secretary to the governor that year, serving even while she was pregnant, until Gruening's departure from his post in 1953.

Political and civic life

Hurley became the Secretary of the Territorial Senate, then the Chief Clerk to Alaska's Constitutional Convention in 1955–1956. Following statehood, she became the Secretary of the State Senate for five sessions. Hurley served as the president of the State Board of Education for seven years and was the executive director of the Alaska Women's Commission for three years. She was the president of the National Federation of Federal Employees. She was on the Statehood Transitional Staff of Governor William A. Egan in 1959–1960. Hurley won the Democratic primary for Lieutenant Governor nomination in 1978, the first woman ever to win a statewide election in Alaska, joining the ticket of Democratic gubernatorial candidate, Anchorage attorney Chancy Croft. In 1984, she won a Mat-Su valley House seat 16-A, chaired the State Affairs Committee and, was a member of the House Education Committee. She served on the Alaska Judicial Council. She was also elected to the Matanuska Electric Association board. She was the Chair of the Alaska Commission for Human Rights, the state Personnel Board and, for nine years, the Matanuska Telephone Association's Board of Directors. She lost her state house seat to Republican Curtis D. Menard in 1986. In 2006, at 85 years old, rather than allow Republican felony suspect Vic Kohring to run unopposed, she ran again for the Alaska house but lost, despite Kohring's burgeoning legal problems. She also served as the executive director of the Alaska Commission on the Status of Women and was the President of the State Board of Education for seven years. She was inducted into the Alaska Women's Hall of Fame in 2009.

Personal life
Hurley was married to Joe Alexander in 1944, and had two children, David and Susan. She remarried in 1960 to Jim Hurley, a delegate to the Alaska Constitutional Convention and a member of the first state legislature. They had a daughter, Mary. They moved to Palmer in 1960, purchased the office of the Alaska Title Guaranty company, and later moved to the shore of Wasilla Lake in 1963. They divorced some time after that. She was the organist for St. David's Episcopal Church in Wasilla for decades. In 2001, she received the Dot Jones award, named for the first woman mayor of the Mat-Su Borough. In 2009, she was inducted into the Alaska Women's Hall of Fame. Hurley died near family in a private memory care facility in Portland, Oregon where she spent the final years of her life. Hurley's passage left delegate and former Alaska state senator Vic Fischer as the sole remaining living participant in the state's Constitutional Convention.

References

External links
 Katie Hurley at 100 Years of Alaska's Legislature
 Katie Hurley interview 360 North – Alaska Pioneers – Katie Video

1921 births
2021 deaths
20th-century American women politicians
Alaska Territory officials
American people of Norwegian descent
Candidates in the 2006 United States elections
Democratic Party members of the Alaska House of Representatives
People from Wasilla, Alaska
Politicians from Juneau, Alaska
Women state legislators in Alaska
21st-century American women politicians